The Dharna barb (Puntius fraseri) is a species of ray-finned fish in the genus Puntius. It is endemic to India.

The fish is named in honor of amateur herpetologist Albert Glen Leslie Fraser (1887-?), who collected the type specimen and supplied the authors with Bhil names of Deolali (India) fishes.

References 

Puntius
Taxa named by Sunder Lal Hora
Taxa named by Kamla Sankar Misra
Fish described in 1938